The NIFTY Next 50 is an index for companies on the National Stock Exchange of India. It represents the next rung of liquid securities after the NIFTY 50. It consists of 50 companies representing approximately 10% of the traded value of all stocks on the National Stock Exchange of India. The NIFTY Next 50 is owned and operated by India Index Services and Products Ltd.  It is quoted using the symbol NSMIDCP.

The NIFTY Next 50 and the NIFTY 50 together comprise the NIFTY 100, which represents the 100 most liquid stocks traded on the National Stock Exchange of India.

Comparison with Nifty 50
Nifty Next 50 was launched on December 24, 1996 considering November 03, 1995 as base date and 1000 as base value while Nifty 50 was launched on April 22, 1996 considering November 03, 1995 as base date and 1000 as base value. Considering the valuations now, Nifty Next 50 has greatly outperformed the Nifty 50.

Record values

Constituents

The companies constituting the NIFTY Next 50 index as of September 2022 are:

See also 

 BSE SENSEX
 NSE NIFTY 500

References

External links
 Official Homepage
 Summary for CNX Nifty Junior - Performance and statistics from Yahoo! Finance
  CNX Nifty Junior Details
 Nse Nifty next 50 Index Details

Indian stock market indices
Year of establishment missing